Rappe or Rappé is a surname. It may refer to:

People
 Baron Axel Rappe (1838–1918), a Swedish military officer
 Baron Axel Rappe (1884–1945), a Swedish military officer
 Emmy Rappe (1835–1896), a Swedish nurse
 Jadwiga Rappé (born 1952), a Polish operatic contralto
 Louis Amadeus Rappe (1801–1877), a French-born bishop of the Roman Catholic Church
 Martin Rappe (born 1993), a German figure skater
 Thorborg Rappe (1832–1902), a Swedish pedagogue and Baroness
 Virginia Rappe (1891–1921), an American model and silent film actress